Carneades hemileuca is a species of beetle in the family Cerambycidae. It was described by Bates in 1881. It is known from Costa Rica and Panama.

References

Colobotheini
Beetles described in 1881